The United Nations Security Council is the organ charged with maintaining peace and security among nations.

Security Council may also refer to:

 Security Council of Abkhazia
 Security Council of Armenia
 Security Council of Azerbaijan
 Security Council of Belarus
 Security Council (Japan), a Ministry of Japan
 Security Council of Kazakhstan
 Security Council of Kyrgyzstan
 Security Council of the Russian Federation, a security affairs consultative body of the Russian Federation
 Security Council of the Soviet Union, an organ of the former USSR in charge of enforcing defense policies
 Security Council of Tajikistan

See also
 National security council, a list